Sphaerocarpaceae is a family of liverworts known as bottle liverworts.  Approximately ten species are included in this family, most of them in the genus Sphaerocarpos, but one additional species in the genus Geothallus.

Distribution 
The majority of species in the family occur along the western edge of the Americas, from Washington to central Chile. However, the type species for Sphaerocarpos, S. michelii, is native to Europe. The weedy species Sphaerocarpos texanus is distributed widely in fields and gardens of North America, western Europe, and Mediterranean Africa. It may have been introduced with soil brought with crops or garden plants imported from the Americas.

Classification 
The group was recognized as a tribe by Barthélemy Dumortier in 1874 and elevated to family rank in 1891 by Moritz Heeg, under the name "Sphaerocarpeae". Two extant genera are recognized, with a single species in Geothallus and the remaining species assigned to Sphaerocarpos

Species 
 Geothallus tuberosus
 Sphaerocarpos cristatus
 Sphaerocarpos donnellii
 Sphaerocarpos drewiae 
 Sphaerocarpos hians 
 Sphaerocarpos michelii 
 Sphaerocarpos stipitatus 
 Sphaerocarpos texanus

References

External links 
  Pictures of Sphaerocarpos texanus 
   Sphaerocarpales

Sphaerocarpales
Liverwort families